The following is a list of all team-to-team transactions that have occurred in the National Hockey League (NHL) during the 1946–47 NHL season. It lists which team each player has been traded to and for which player(s) or other consideration(s), if applicable.

Transactions 

Notes
 Trade voided later in June 1946 when Hollett decided to retire.

References

Transactions
National Hockey League transactions